Aristotelis Valaoritis (1824–1879) was a Greek poet, representative of the Heptanese School, and politician. He was also the great-grandfather of Nanos Valaoritis, one of the most distinguished writers of Greece.

Biography

He was born in Lefkada in 1824 and was of Aromanian descent. His father was a rich merchant from the region of Epirus. Valaoritis completed his school education in Lefkada and Corfu. Afterwards he went to France and Italy to study law. He never worked as a lawyer though, but completely devoted himself to poetry. He spent an important part of his life in the small island of Madouri.

At the age of 25 he married the daughter of the Venetian scholar Emilio De Tipaldo, Eloisa. Using simple language he wrote many poems regarding the Greek War of Independence. He was credited as a national poet. Some of his most important works are: Stichourgimata, Mnemosina, Kira Frosini, Athanasios Diakos, O Fotinos, Astrapogiannos.

O Fotinos (or Der Helle in German), is a very famous unfinished poem relating the so-called Voukentra revolution of 1357 in Lefkada against the Venetian (Italian) occupation. Valaoritis composed this poem on the privately owned isle of Madouri.

Meanwhile, he got into politics. As a member of the Parliament of the United States of the Ionian Islands he fought for the rights of the Ionian islands, such as the union with the Kingdom of Greece. Once the Ionian islands were united with Greece he moved to Athens, as a member of the Greek Parliament. His speeches were heavily influenced by his poetic language, making his rhetorical skills uniquely remarkable. The last years of his life, he developed action towards the integration of Epirus to Greece, a goal not fully achieved until the Balkan Wars.

He died in Lefkada in 1879 due to heart failure.

Work
Poems

 Ι Kira Frosini, Η Κυρά Φροσύνη (1859)
 Athanasios Diakos, Αθανάσιος Διάκος (1867)
 Thanasis Bagias, Θανάσης Βάγιας (1867)
 Astrapogiannos, Αστραπόγιαννος (1867)
 O andrias tou aidimou Grigoriou tou E, Ο ανδριάς του αοιδίμου Γρηγορίου του Ε (1872)
 O Fotinos, Ο Φωτεινός (incomplete, published posthumously in 1891)

Collections

 Stichourgimata, Στιχουργήματα (1847)
 Mnemosina, Μνημόσυνα (1857)

Others
 Poiemata, Ποιήματα (1891)
 Erga, Εργα (1893)
 Vios kai erga, Βίος και έργα (1907)
 Poiemata anekdota, Ποιήματα ανέκδοτα (1937)
 Ta Apanta, Τα Άπαντα  (1968)

References

External links
 
 

Modern Greek poets
1824 births
1879 deaths
19th-century Greek people
People from Lefkada
Greek people of Aromanian descent
Aromanian poets
Heptanese School (literature)
19th-century Greek poets